Nicholas Costantini (born 31 July 1989) is an Italian footballer who plays for Lega Pro Foligno.

Biography
Costantini was a member of Genoa C.F.C. reserve team from 2006 to 2009. He also played for Genoa's U17 team since 2004–05 season.

In July 2009, Costantini left for Lega Pro club Ternana. In July 2010, Costantini was sold to Lucchese in co-ownership deal for €500. He only played 3 starts for the Group B side of the third division.

In June 2011 Genoa bought back Costantini for €500 and soon Lucchese went bankrupted. In July 2011 Costantini left for Foligno on free transfer. After 8 starts with the Group A side of the prima divisione, Costantini left for A.C. Prato on 30 January 2012. At the end of season Foligno relegated directly as the least, and Prato had to play relegation "play-out".

Costantini played two friendlies in 2005–06 season for Italy national under-17 football team.

Honours
 Coppa Italia Primavera: 2009 (Genoa youth)

References

External links
 FIGC 
 Football.it Profile 

Italian footballers
Genoa C.F.C. players
Ternana Calcio players
S.S.D. Lucchese 1905 players
A.S.D. Città di Foligno 1928 players
A.C. Prato players
Association football midfielders
1989 births
Living people